The Bent County Correctional Facility  is a private medium-security prison for men located in Las Animas, Bent County, Colorado.  The facility is owned and operated by CoreCivic under contract with the Colorado Department of Corrections and houses Colorado inmates.    

CoreCivic has run the facility since 1996, and it has an official capacity of 1466 inmates.  It was Colorado's first private prison.

References

Prisons in Colorado
Buildings and structures in Bent County, Colorado
CoreCivic
1996 establishments in Colorado